"Sun of Jamaica" is a song performed by German group Goombay Dance Band, written by Ekkehard Stein and Wolfgang Jass. The song was released at the end of 1979, and subsequently included on their debut album, Sun of Jamaica.

The lyrics recount the narrator's desire to visit Jamaica after seeing Mutiny on the Bounty as a boy. He explicitly mentions Marlon Brando in the lyrics, thus referring to the 1962 film version. When he visits, he falls in love with a woman, and vows to later return to be with her. The song was highly successful across Europe, reaching number 1 in no less than five countries. Goombay Dance Band have re-recorded the track a number of times later in their career.

Track listings
7" Single (1979)
A. "Sun of Jamaica" – 4:22
B. "Island of Dreams" – 3:26

Charts and certifications

Weekly charts

Year-end charts

Certifications

Cover versions
German singer Tony Holiday recorded a German version of the song in 1980, "Nie mehr allein sein".
In 1980, Czech singer Helena Vondráčková covered the song as "Léto je léto", which was a minor hit.
In 1980, Slovak band Expres covered the song with Slovak lyrics by Albín Škoviera under the name "Náhrdelník z perál".
In 1983, German cross-culture band Cusco released an instrumental version of the song on their album Virgin Islands.
In 1980, Argentinian Jairo (singer) reached Number one in France with a French version (Les Jardins du Ciel), he also recorded a Spanish version called "Nuestro Amor Será un Himno", which was a top 10 hit in Argentina.
In 1982, Croatian singer Darko Domijan made song 'Ruze u snijegu' as a copy of this song
In 1980, Belgian Band "The Strangers" recorded a Flemish version in the Antwerp dialect "'t Strand Van St-Anneke"

References

1980 singles
Dutch Top 40 number-one singles
Goombay Dance Band songs
Number-one singles in Austria
Number-one singles in Germany
Ultratop 50 Singles (Flanders) number-one singles
Schlager songs
CBS Records singles
1980 songs
Songs about Jamaica
Cultural depictions of Marlon Brando